Cephaliini is a tribe of picture-winged flies in the family Ulidiidae.

Genera
Acrostictella Hendel, 1914
Cephalia Meigen, 1826
Delphinia Robineau-Desvoidy, 1830
Myiomyrmica Steyskal, 1961
Myrmecothea Hendel, 1910
Proteseia Korneyev & Hernandes, 1998
Pterotaenia Rondani, 1868
Tritoxa Loew, 1873

References

Ulidiidae
Diptera tribes
Taxa named by Ignaz Rudolph Schiner
Diptera of North America
Diptera of South America
Diptera of Europe